Chascomús is an east central partido (administrative district) of the Province of Buenos Aires in Argentina.

History
The partido was founded in 1801, by Pedro Nicolás Escribano.

Economy
Chascomús, like most of Buenos Aires province, has many beef cattle and dairy farms. Agricultural produce from the area includes maize, wheat, barley, oats,  and sorghum, while apiculture also plays a role in the local economy.

The district also has a strong industrial sector, producing dairy products, textiles and agricultural machinery.

The tourist industry in Chascomús is mainly dominated by weekend tourism from Greater Buenos Aires.

Settlements
Adela
Atilio Pessagno
Chascomús (capital)
Comandante Giribone
Don Cipriano
Gandara
Libres del Sud
Manuel Jose Cobo
Monasterio
Paraje El Destino
Pedro Nicolás Escribano

References

External links

 
Merchant, R.M. (1957) An Historical Record of The Scots Presbyterian Church, Chascomús Argentina,  Buenos Aires, ASIN‎ B003DURYLC

Partidos of Buenos Aires Province
Populated places established in 1801